George Mathers may refer to:

 George Mathers, 1st Baron Mathers (1886–1965), Scottish trade unionist and politician
 George Mathers (architect) (1919–2015), English architect